Tuxedo Source for Sports is a Canadian retailer of sports equipment, mainly hockey and bicycles, based in Calgary, Alberta. Founded by the Gregory family in 1960 as "Tuxedo Cycle & Sports" in the Tuxedo area of Calgary, the store has remained family owned ever since. They stock an extensive hockey selection and for carrying such brands as Bauer, Easton and Graf. Despite primarily being a hockey retailer, Tuxedo, who were one of the first major bicycle stores in Calgary along with Bow Cycle and Ridley Cycle, also serve as a specialty bicycle shop in northern Calgary. Specialized and Giant have been their two main lines of bicycles for a number of years.

On May 15, 2010, Tuxedo held a gala evening at McMahon Stadium's Red and White Club to celebrate the store's 50th anniversary.

References

External links
 Tuxedo Source For Sports' website

Companies based in Calgary
Retail companies established in 1960
Sporting goods retailers of Canada
Cycle retailers